Apolline Dreyfuss (born 30 December 1986) is a French synchronized swimmer who competed in the 2008 Summer Olympics.

Personal
Dreyfuss was born on 30 December 1986 in Strasbourg. Dreyfuss is 173 centimetres (5 ft 8 in) tall and weighs 57 kilograms (130 lb).

Synchronized swimming
Dreyfuss is a synchronized swimmer, specialises in solo and duet events. She decided to retire in 2010 at the age of 23, to concentrate on her studies. As of 2010, she is student of the French business school ESCP Europe.

Career records
Solo
2006, European Aquatics Championships, Budapest, 8th

Duet
2003, France National Championships, 2nd
2004, France National Championships, 1st
2006, European Aquatics Championships, Budapest, 8th
2008, Summer Olympics, Beijing, 11th (with Lila Meesseman-Bakir)
2009, World Aquatics Championships, Rome, 8th (with Lila Meesseman-Bakir)
2010, European Aquatics Championships, Budapest, 6th (with Chloé Willhelm)

Team
2006, European Aquatics Championships, Budapest, 6th
2009, World Aquatics Championships, Rome, 7th (free routine)
2009, World Aquatics Championships, Rome, 9th (technical routine)
2010, European Aquatics Championships, Budapest, 5th

Combination
2006, European Aquatics Championships, Budapest, 5th
2008, European Aquatics Championships, Eindhoven, 5th

References

1986 births
Living people
Sportspeople from Strasbourg
French synchronized swimmers
Olympic synchronized swimmers of France
Synchronized swimmers at the 2008 Summer Olympics